Zanesville may refer to some places in the United States:

Zanesville, Ohio, population 25,361
Zanesville High School
The Zanesville Indians, a minor-league baseball team (1944-1950)
The Zanesville Infants, a baseball team (1908-1909)
The Zanesville Mark Grays, an American football team (1916–1922)
Zanesville Municipal Airport
Zanesville, Indiana, population 602
Zanesville, Illinois, unincorporated
Zanesville Township, Montgomery County, Illinois

Literature
Zanesville (novel), a 2005 novel

Music
Zanesville (band) a band from Tampa, Florida